The C Line was a light rail line, part of the rail system operated by the Regional Transportation District in the Denver-Aurora Metropolitan Area in Colorado.

History 
The line was added to the system on April 5, 2002, to coincide with the opening of the Central Platte Valley Spur. Initially, C trains operated seven days a week, but ran to Littleton–Mineral station only during peak hours and sporting events. At all other times, C service operated to I-25/Broadway.

On May 3, 2003, C trains began operating to Littleton–Mineral station at all times.

With the opening of the Southeast Corridor on November 17, 2006, weekend C service was discontinued except for certain sporting events, with the new E line operating seven days per week.

On January 11, 2009, the midday service pattern between Union Station and I-25/Broadway was resumed and evening service discontinued.

Midday weekday service was discontinued on January 19, 2012 and was reinstated on August 17, 2014 over the entire route.

The C Line was suspended on January 10, 2021 as part of broader service cuts in response to ridership decreases related to the COVID-19 pandemic. The line never returned to service and was officially eliminated ahead of the January 2023 service change.

Stations 
The C Line's northern terminus was at Union Station in Denver, ran on a railroad right-of-way south to its junction with the D Line at 10th & Osage Station, and shared track with the D Line until both lines reach their southern terminus at Mineral Avenue in Littleton.

In addition, the C Line provided access to the sports venues of Denver – Coors Field, Pepsi Center, and Broncos Stadium at Mile High – Six Flags Elitch Gardens, and LoDo, as well as access to the western portion of the Auraria Campus.

FasTracks 

The 2004 voter approved FasTracks plan will add  to the Southwest Corridor (C Line and D Line).  It will also add a station with 1,000 parking spots at C-470 and Lucent Boulevard in Highlands Ranch. There may also be a station at C-470 and Santa Fe Boulevard.

References

External links 

RTD C Line Schedule

RTD light rail
Transportation in Arapahoe County, Colorado
750 V DC railway electrification
Railway lines opened in 2002
Railway services discontinued in 2021